A semantic broker is a computer service that automatically provides semantic mapper services.  A semantic broker is frequently part of a semantic middleware system that leverage semantic equivalence statements. To qualify as a semantic broker product a system must be able to automatically extract data from a message and use semantic equivalence statements to transform this into another namespace.

See also
 Intelligent agent

Information systems
Semantic Web